The history of anorexia nervosa begins with descriptions of religious fasting dating from the Hellenistic era and continuing  into the medieval period.  A number of well known historical figures, including Catherine of Siena and Mary, Queen of Scots are believed to have suffered from the condition.

The earliest medical descriptions of anorexic illnesses are generally credited to English physician Richard Morton, in 1689. 
However it was not until the late 19th century that anorexia nervosa was to be widely accepted by the medical profession as a recognized condition.  In 1873, Sir William Gull, one of Queen Victoria's personal physicians, published a seminal paper which established the term anorexia nervosa and provided a number of detailed case descriptions and treatments.   In the same year, French physician Ernest-Charles Lasègue similarly published details of a number of cases in a paper entitled De l’Anorexie Hystérique.

Awareness of the condition was largely limited to the medical profession until the latter part of the 20th century, when German-American psychoanalyst Hilde Bruch published her popular work The Golden Cage: the Enigma of Anorexia Nervosa in 1978.  This book created a wider awareness of anorexia nervosa among lay readers.  A further important event was the death of the popular singer Karen Carpenter in 1983, which prompted widespread ongoing media coverage of eating disorders.

Etymology
The term anorexia nervosa was established in 1873 by Queen Victoria’s personal physician, Sir William Gull.  The term anorexia is of Greek origin: an- (ἀν-, prefix denoting negation) and orexis (ὄρεξις, "appetite"), thus translating to "nervous absence of appetite".

In an earlier address, in 1868, Gull referred to the condition as Apepsia hysterica, but subsequently amended this to Anorexia hysterica and then to Anorexia nervosa.  In a paper published in 1873, French physician Ernest-Charles Lasègue published a paper entitled De l’Anorexie Hystérique.  The use, and subsequent abandonment, of the term hysterica is of interest, since in the Victorian era the term was interpreted as applying to female behaviour.  In 1873, Gull wrote:

Early descriptions

13th and 14th Centuries: Saint Catherine of Siena & Saint Hedwig of Andechs or Silesia
Of interest in terms of anorexia nervosa is the medieval practice of self-starvation by women, including some young women, in the name of religious piety and purity. This is sometimes referred to as anorexia mirabilis. By the thirteenth century, it was increasingly common for women to participate in religious life and to even be named as saints by the Catholic Church. Many women who ultimately became saints engaged in self-starvation, including Saint Hedwig of Andechs in the thirteenth century and Catherine of Siena in the fourteenth century. By the time of Catherine of Siena, however, the Church became concerned about extreme fasting as an indicator of spirituality and as a criterion for sainthood. Indeed, Catherine of Siena was told by Church authorities to pray that she would be able to eat again, but was unable to give up fasting.

Historical cases of men's abstention from eating for religious or (other) spiritual reasons tends to be regarded as 'asceticism'.

1556: Mary, Queen of Scots

Mary Stuart, known as Mary, Queen of Scots, was brought up as a child in the court of Henry II of France.  Her medical history is documented in some detail thanks to the accounts of various ambassadors who sent reports back to their respective sovereigns.  It is known, for example, that she had measles when she was five, rubella when she was seven, dysentery and malaria when she was 14 and smallpox when she was 15.

She also had an unnamed illness as a teenager that some now believe to have been anorexia nervosa/chlorosis Her condition is described as involving weight loss, uneven appetite, vomiting and diarrhoea, pallor, fainting fits and breathing difficulties.  She was, however, physically active throughout the illness; she continued to ride on horseback and dance in the evenings at the same time as these symptoms were observed.

1613: Jane Balan – the “French fasting girl of Confolens”

The case of Jane Balans, the “French Fasting Girl of Confolens,” was described in 1613 by Pedro Mexico.  He noted that she “lived without receiving meat or drink for at least three years.”  The condition began on 15 February 1599, when Jane Balans was around 10 years old.  After suffering a fever and vomiting, she became withdrawn and weakened, refusing all food.

Contemporary superstition blamed the wicked power of an apple given her by an old woman some months prior to the start of the condition; Mexio diagnosed the case as a “drying up of the liver and of all the parts serving to nourishment due to hurtful humours”

1689: Richard Morton’s case descriptions

Two early medical descriptions of a syndrome involving loss of appetite and extreme fasting without any evidence of known disease are provided by the English physician Richard Morton in 1689.  He provided two case descriptions in his “Phthisiologia: Or, a Treatise of Consumptions,” a 1694 translation of his 1689 work “Phthisiologica, seu exercitationes de phthisi libris comprehensae. Totumque opus variis histories illustratum.”  Morton described these cases as “Nervous Atrophy, or Consumption.”  The first, in 1684, involved a “Mr Duke’s daughter in St Mary Axe” (a street in the City of London).  He writes of her thus:

The girl consulted Dr Morton only after she had been ill for two years, and then only because she experienced frequent fainting fits.  Morton described her as a “Skeleton only clad in skin.” He noted her “continual poring upon Books” despite her condition and that she was indifferent to the extreme cold of an unusually severe winter.  She refused any treatment (which consisted of the likes of cloves bruised in wine, and stomach plasters).  She died three months later.

The other patient was described as “The Son of the Reverend Minister Steele.”  He began to fast at the age of 16.  Morton attributed his “want of appetite” to “studying too hard” as well as the “passions of his mind.”  Morton was more successful with this patient, who followed the doctor's advice to abandon his studies and move to the country, take up riding and drink plenty of milk, whereupon he “recovered his health in great measure.”

1770s: Timothy Dwight

In a biography of Noah Webster, a near-fatal case of anorexia was described of an instructor at Yale College:

1790: Robert Willan’s case description

Robert Willan was an English physician in London who is credited with founding dermatology as a medical speciality.  He is one of the first to describe the symptoms of extreme weight loss in males, in his paper “A Remarkable Case of Abstinence,” published in Medical Communications in 1790.  This describes the case of a young Englishman who died in 1786 after fasting for 78 days.  He wrote:

19th Century descriptions

1859: Louis-Victor Marcé’s case descriptions 

Louis-Victor Marcé (1828–1864), a French physician in Paris, published a number of case studies describing psychiatric disorders of women during and following pregnancy. His case descriptions included that of a patient displaying the symptoms of anorexia nervosa in 1859. In 1860, Marcé wrote:

1868: William Gull (address to the British Medical Association)

In 1868, William Gull was a leading British physician living in London. That year, he described his observations of an emaciated condition in young women in an address to the British Medical Association (BMA) in Oxford. He observed that the causes of the condition were unknown, but that the subjects affected were "mostly of the female sex, and chiefly between the ages of sixteen and twenty three" although he also qualified this statement by adding that he had occasionally seen it in males of the same age.

The Lancet (the BMA's in-house journal) published the following extract from Gull's address:

1873: Sir William Gull’s "Anorexia Nervosa" paper

By 1873, Sir William Gull had been made a Baronet  and was one of four Physicians-in-Ordinary to Queen Victoria.  In that year, he published his seminal work “Anorexia Nervosa (Apepsia Hysterica, Anorexia Hysterica)", in which he describes  the three cases of Miss A, Miss B, and a third unnamed case. In 1887, he also recorded the case of Miss K, in what was to be the last of his medical papers to be published.

Sir William Gull writes that Miss A was referred to him on 17 January 1866. She was aged 17 and was greatly emaciated, having lost 33 pounds.  Her weight at this time was 5 stone 12 pounds (82 pounds/37kgs); her height was 5 ft 5 inches /167 cm (body mass index of 13.5).  Gull records that most of her physical condition was normal, with healthy respiration, heart sounds and pulse; no vomiting nor diarrhoea; clean tongue and normal urine.  The condition was that of simple starvation, with total refusal of animal food and almost total refusal of everything else.

Gull prescribed various remedies (including preparations of cinchona, biochloride of mercury, syrup of iodide of iron, syrup of phosphate of iron, citrate of quinine) and variations in diet without noticeable success. He noted occasional voracious appetite for very brief periods, but states that these were very rare and exceptional.  He also records that she was frequently restless and active and notes that this was a "striking expression of the nervous state, for it seemed hardly possible that a body so wasted could undergo the exercise which seemed agreeable".

In Gull's published medical papers, images of Miss A are shown that depict her appearance before and after treatment (right).  Gull notes her aged appearance at age 17:

 Miss A remained under Gull's observation from January 1866 to March 1868, by which time she seemed to have made a full recovery, having gained in weight from 82 lbs/37 kg to 128 lbs/58 kg.

Miss B was referred to Gull on 8 October 1868, aged 18, as a case of suspected tuberculosis.  Gull noted that her emaciated appearance was more extreme than normally occurs in tubercular cases.  His physical examination of her chest and abdomen discovered nothing abnormal, but he recorded a "peculiar restlessness" that was difficult to control.  The mother advised that "She is never tired".  Gull was struck by the similarity of the case to that of Miss A, even to the detail of the pulse and respiration observations.

Miss B was treated by Gull until 1872, by which time a noticeable recovery was underway and eventually complete.  Gull admits in his medical papers that the medical treatment probably did not contribute much to the recovery, consisting, as in the former case, of various tonics and a nourishing diet.

Although the cases of Miss A and Miss B resulted in recovery, Gull states that he observed at least one fatality as a result of anorexia nervosa.  He states that the post mortem revealed no physical abnormalities other than thrombosis of the femoral veins.  Death appeared to have resulted from starvation alone.

1873: Ernest-Charles Lasègue

Ernest-Charles Lasègue was a French physician who practised at the Salpêtrière, Pitié and Necker hospitals. From 1869, he was a professor of clinical medicine at Hôpital Necker.

In 1873, Lasègue published a paper entitled "De l’Anorexie Histerique" in the Archives générales de Médecin. Later that year, a translated version of the paper was published in the British Medical Times.

Lasègue began the article by noting the importance of recognizing hysterical anorexia as a diagnostic entity, and then described the progression of the illness. He proposed the hypothesis that at the onset of the disease, lack of appetite originates from a wish to avoid pain. After this, a passage was deleted from the translation which described 'the paradoxical liveliness' of the anorexic. Lasègue contrasted anorexic behaviour to the behaviour of people forced into starvation during the great famine in Paris. Lasegue then described the downward spiral of the anorexic, characterized by indifference, disgust, aversion, and eventually starvation, ill health and possible death.

Lasègue's paper contrasts with Gull's work by its focus on the psychological symptoms and examination of the role of parental influences and family interactions.  He wrote about some of the family dynamics inherent in anorexic families, and provided a detailed description of a scene in which relatives try to persuade an anorexic to eat.

In an addendum to his Anorexia Nervosa paper, Sir William Gull provides the following comment on Lasègue's work:

Recent history
Although the medical facts of anorexia nervosa have been documented since the 1870s, public awareness of the condition was limited until the second half of the 20th century.  The concept of obsession with body image as a motivating factor for excessive fasting did not emerge until the mid-1960s,
and it was not until 1980 that body image disturbance was formally included as a diagnostic criterion in the Diagnostic and Statistical Manual of Mental Disorders published by the American Psychiatric Association. More recently, with progress in the field of neuroscience researchers have increasingly looked at anorexia as a biologically-based mental disorder, like schizophrenia.

According to Disorders in Social Relationships published by the Sciences Po University press anorexia nervosa affects young girls in the middle and upper social class. The symptoms of anorexia nervosa is closely entwined with "social relations". Between the ages of 15-24 with the disorder are at a 10% greater risk of dying than others at the same age. In a 2020 review it was found that AN runs in families and is often fatal.

It was also found that "The National Eating Disorders Association (NEDA) estimates that between 0.3 and 0.4 percent of all young women and 0.1 percent of young men suffer from AN on this or any day. They estimate that approximately 1 percent of women and 0.3 percent of men reported Anorexia during their lifetimes" in the 2020 Breakthrough Research in Anorexia Nervosa by Drs. Cynthia Bulik and Walter Kaye.

Recent Found Insights and Treatments

In the 2020 Breakthrough article it was also found that "Medications, psychedelic medicine, and deep brain stimulation may offer hope and help us to understand which diseases are the most like Anorexia Nervosa, major depression, OCD, or SUDs."

There has been progress with studying AN and it is commonly linked to important genetic and neurobiological causes.

Hilde Bruch research and publications
Hilde Bruch (March 11, 1904 – December 15, 1984) was a German-born American psychoanalyst, who practised at Baylor College of Medicine, Houston in the United States.  Her early career focussed on obesity; but from the early 1960s she increasingly turned her attention to anorexia nervosa and its underlying causes.  Bruch's  1973 work Eating Disorders: Obesity, Anorexia Nervosa, and the Person Within is considered a seminal work on the subject and was the first of several works that documented her work with anorexic subjects.

Her best known work is The Golden Cage: the Enigma of Anorexia Nervosa, published in 1978. This book drew on material in Eating Disorders in a publication aimed at a lay readership.  It sold 150,000 copies and is recognized as one of the earliest publications that created a wider awareness of anorexia nervosa beyond the medical profession.

Death of Karen Carpenter
Karen Carpenter was a popular American vocal and drummer musician. Her death on February 4, 1983, was attributed to heart failure as a consequence of anorexia nervosa.

Public awareness of anorexia nervosa and other eating disorders was transformed by Karen Carpenter's death.  Her young age (32) coupled with her fame as an entertainer captured public attention and received extensive media coverage.  The sympathetic reporting of her illness prompted other celebrities, such as Jane Fonda and Lynn Redgrave, to come forward and share their experiences.

Karen Carpenter's brother and singing partner, Richard Carpenter, established a fund dedicated to his sister's memory for research into anorexia nervosa.

Notes

References
 Brumberg, Joan Jacobs;  Fasting Girls: The History of Anorexia Nervosa.  Vintage Books, 2000.  
 Carol Lawson; Anorexia: It's Not a New Disease, Published: December 8, 1985
Palm Beach Post, December 26, 1985.

See also
 List of deaths from anorexia nervosa
 Anorexia mirabilis
 Fasting girl

Anorexia nervosa
Anorexia